is a video game developed by Japan System Supply and published by Sunsoft for the Nintendo 64 released in 1998. It is the sequel to Chameleon Twist.

Story
The story of Chameleon Twist 2 takes place after the events in Chameleon Twist. Davy and his friends (Jack, Fred, and Linda) are playing in the forest, still carrying the backpack from his last adventure, when suddenly the rabbit (closely resembling Lewis Carroll's White Rabbit) from before falls down and knocks one of the chameleons into the sky. The chameleon transforms into an enhanced-looking humanoid chameleon and goes on a search for six carrots in six different worlds.

Gameplay
The game changed certain aspects of the original, such as the character designs and the switched colors of the main characters. New moves were added, such as a parachute that could be deployed to make a slow descent and that could be used in conjunction with the tongue.  Moreover, vertical pole swings were added, rather than having only horizontal.

The player may talk to the rabbit whenever it is encountered. The rabbit would ask them if they wanted to go to a practice course, and they could either accept or decline. If they declined, the rabbit would fly away and the player would not be able to visit that bonus course anytime again in the game.

The worlds are much longer than those of the first.  However, there is no longer a multiplayer mode.

Graphics and sound
Chameleon Twist 2 has imaginative dreamworld environments. The textures of the worlds are less detailed, but more colorful. The Japanese version featured the same design for the playable characters as the first game, while in International versions outside of the Japanese release, the design has been edited to be more chameleon-like. In Japan, Davy is blue, while Jack is green. In the International versions, Davy is green while Jack is blue, in contrast to the original.

Reception

The game received "unfavorable" reviews according to the review aggregation website GameRankings. In Japan, Famitsu gave it a score of 24 out of 40. Nintendo Power gave it an average review nearly two months before its U.S. release date.

Official Nintendo Magazine claimed Chameleon Twist 2 was better than its predecessor, in terms of gameplay and its colorful visuals, but was too short and could be completed within a day. It found the music "annoying" and criticized the scarce sound effects.

References

External links

1998 video games
3D platform games
Japan System Supply games
Nintendo 64 games
Nintendo 64-only games
Sunsoft games
Video game sequels
Video games about reptiles
Video games set in amusement parks
Video games developed in Japan
Video games set in Egypt
Video games set in Japan
Fictional chameleons and geckos
Single-player video games